Devanahalli, also called "Devandahalli", "Dyaavandalli", Devanadoddi, and Devanapura, is a town and Town Municipal Council in Bengaluru Rural district in the state of Karnataka in India. Devanahalli is the site of Kempegowda International Airport. A multibillion-dollar Devanahalli Business Park with two IT Parks are coming up on nearly  adjoining the airport. An Aerospace Park, Science Park and a  Financial City are also coming up. A new satellite ring road will connect the city with Doddaballapur. Devanahalli is situated near the upcoming ,  BIAL IT Investment Region, to be the largest IT region in India.

With significant commercial and residential development in the area, real estate is in high demand in the region. Devanahalli was the birthplace of Tipu Sultan, popularly known as the "Tiger of Mysore".

History
Devanahalli was part of Gangawadi and later came under the rule of Rashatrakutas, Nolambas, Pallavas, Cholas, Hoysalas and the Vijayanagara rulers.

The recent history of Devanahalli dates back to the 15th century, when a family of refugees fleeing from Conjeevaram (modern day Kanchi), camped near the foot of Ramaswami betta, east of Nandi Hills. Their leader Rana Baire Gowda was apparently directed in a dream to set up a settlement in this region. He and his Morasu Wokkalu family settled in a small village, Ahuti, which was later known as Avati. His son Malla Baire Gowda founded Devanahalli, Chikka-ballapura and Dodda-ballapura. Kempegowda, the founder of Bangalore city is also from Morasu Wokkalu family.[5] During the time of Vijayanagara rule, Malla Baire constructed the initial mud fort in 1501 AD with the consent of Devaraya at Devanadoddi, the previous name of Devanahalli.

In 1747 AD, the fort passed into the hands of the Wodeyars of Mysore under the command of Nanja Raja. It was conquered many times from the Marathas and later came under the control of Hyder Ali and Tipu Sultan. Tipu also renamed it as Yousafabad (the abode of Yousuf, the finest man) which never got popular.

The fort finally fell into the British, under Lord Cornwallis in 1791, during the Mysore War.

Demographics
 India census, Devanahalli had a population of 23,190. Males constituted 52% of the population and females 48%. Devanahalli had an average literacy rate of 66%, higher than the national average of 59.5%: male literacy was 73% and female literacy was 58%. In Devanahalli, 12% of the population was under 6 years of age.

Tourism
Devanahalli is just an hour's drive from Bangalore. There has been a growth of tourist traffic recently due to the impetus provided by the Bangalore International Airport.

Devanahalli fort, spread over an area of 20 acres that includes twelve bastions is a magnificent reminder of the power that the ruling dynasties held since the 15th century.

There are numerous temples within the fort with impeccable architecture. Of all the temples, the Venugopala Swami Temple is the most visited and the oldest. The courtyard is spacious. The walls of the temple depict various scenes from Ramayana and the pillars have beautiful statues carved on them. The temple is a protected monument under Archaeological Survey of India. Nearby Siddhalingeshwara swami temple is equally popular. Chandramouleshwara temple, Nanjundeshwara temple, Veerabhadraswami temple, Ranganathaswamy temple, Kalamma temple, Raghavendraswamy matha, Mahantha Matha, Balagopala (old), Nagareshwara and Basaveshwara are other places of worship.

There is a large pond known as Sarovara said to have been built by Deewan Purnaiah of Mysore kingdom and the Anjaneya in the Shrine near to it is called Sarovaranjaneya.

Within the fort, there is the house in which Haider Ali and Tipu Sultan called home, where Tipu was born. There is a memorial now at the birthplace of Tipu Sultan little outside the fort. It is about six feet tall with a pillared enclosure and square top and bears a stone tablet. It has an enclosure. The area called Khas Bagh, now contains many tamarind trees, a few mango trees, and a small dried pond. It was once an enchanting spot, being Tipu's private park.

Kempegowda International Airport

The terminal was designed to serve up to 12 million passengers per year, but has been expanded to cater to 15 million passengers. It can be reached from Devanahalli by heading south on NH 44 and taking the left exit on the trumpet interchange.

AirAsia India has its head office in the Alpha 3 building on the airport grounds.

References

External links

 Arvind greatlands 

Cities and towns in Bangalore Rural district